Arturo Acevedo Vallarino (1873–1950) was a Colombian film director known for the silent films La tragedia del silencio (1924) and Bajo el Cielo Antioqueño (1925). In order to buy his first movie camera, he sold a timber plantation. In 1920, he founded production company Acevedo e Hijos.

Arturo spent his childhood in Zipaquirá with his father, General Ramón Acevedo. He married Laura Mendez Bernal and had six children.

References

External links

Colombian film directors
People from Bogotá
People from Cundinamarca Department
1873 births
1950 deaths